The Lives of Mount Druitt Youth is a 2010 documentary film produced, and directed by Saad Adam, covering multiple subjects with intentions of "living a good life in Mount Druitt", inspired by Mount Druitt, NSW, Australia, being the place where the director was raised.

Production 
Saad created his own production company, 'Question Mark Films', and began working on the documentary in the autumn of 2009.  The film was produced and directed with no budget, with the cinematographer/director using a Canon HG 21 camera, a broken camera stand, and an inexpensive microphone.  The director interviewed 28 persons, 22 of whom appear in the documentary.

The filmmaker noted that family trips to the now-closed Wonderland Sydney helped him keep away from crime when growing up, and so recently created a petition calling on the State Government to build a theme park in western Sydney, as both a boost to local economy and a destination for Mount Druitt youth away from crime areas.

The film is being screened at such film festivals as the American Artist Film Festival, INDIE World Film Festival & Jura Books Festival.

Storyline 
In the documentary Saad returns to Mount Druitt and offers a view that is rarely seen by "outsiders", through his exploring the lives of various youths in a suburb that has otherwise built up a notorious reputation for crime and drugs.  The documentary explores the real-life backgrounds and stories that run contrary to the stereotypical branding of the suburb.

Interviewees 

 Saad Adam
 Evan Adam
 Simon Bodie
 Marisa Boye
 Kane Browning
 Michael Chippendale
 Kimberly Delia
 Matt Green
 Andrew Herreros
 Craig Hudson

 Alan John
 Steven John
 Ringo Madut
 Sione Mahe
 Mathew Muddle
 Sean O'Malley
 Justin Pearce
 Drew Pearson
 Sage Pratt
 Amy Robertson

 Suny Sidhoo
 Mitchell Sparkes
 Aida Takla
 Matthias Tuifua
 Beniamin Tupu
 Catalin Tupu
 Damien Vella
 Bowen West

References

External links 

 

2010 films
Australian documentary films
2010 documentary films
Mount Druitt
2010s English-language films